Cyst nematodes may refer to:
 Cactodera, a genus that includes the cactus cyst nematode, Cactodera cacti
 Globodera, or potato cyst nematode, a genus of roundworms that live on the roots of the plant family Solanaceae
 Heterodera, a genus of nematodes in the family Heteroderidae

Animal common name disambiguation pages